WOSH-TV, UHF analog channel 48, was a television station licensed to Oshkosh, Wisconsin, United States. It was the first UHF television station in the state of Wisconsin, and the third television station of any kind on the air in the state, after NBC affiliate WTMJ-TV in 1947 and CBS (now ABC) affiliate WBAY-TV in March 1953.

History

WOSH-TV was granted a license to operate on November 26, 1952, shortly after the FCC ended a three-year freeze on the creation of new television licenses in the United States, and began broadcasting at 4 p.m. local time on July 1, 1953 with 100 watts of power, expected to be increased to 1 kilowatt later in the year. The station shared its call letters with AM sister station WOSH, and broadcast from the same tower. WOSH-TV gained an affiliation with ABC on December 26, 1953.

WOSH-TV faced several issues as 1954 began. UHF tuners, which had already gained a reputation for poor reception and tuning, were not in enough households in the WOSH broadcast area to attract advertisers, and were not a requirement on new television sets, most of which were VHF only.

Additionally, as was soon discovered generally, UHF stations did not have the same broadcast characteristics as more established VHF stations; their signals did not travel as far with similar transmission power. All of these factors, along with new competition in the form of newly announced VHF stations WMBV-TV (channel 11, now WLUK-TV) and WFRV-TV (channel 5) (meaning consumers in the area had even less reason to purchase television sets that were UHF capable) proved to be too much for WOSH-TV, and it announced it would cease broadcasting on March 23, 1954, citing a lack of advertisers and general difficulties with being a UHF broadcaster. The market also began a slow consolidation of station transmitter into the Green Bay area, specifically Scray Hill in the Town of Glenmore to provide one point of reception, rather than multiple towers down the Fox River and Lake Winnebago.

The only other UHF station in northeast Wisconsin at this time, WNAM-TV, announced in November 1954 that it would merge its operations with WFRV-TV, which had yet to sign on. UHF television would not return to the market until 1968 when KFIZ-TV went on the air in Fond du Lac, Wisconsin, which was shut down in 1972.

References 

Defunct television stations in the United States
Television stations in Wisconsin
Television channels and stations established in 1953
Television channels and stations disestablished in 1954
1953 establishments in Wisconsin
1954 disestablishments in Wisconsin
OSH-TV